A1 Hrvatska d.o.o. is a Croatian telecommunications company owned by A1 Telekom Austria Group. It was launched in July 1999 as Vipnet and rebranded to A1 in 2018.

History

1999–2009

Granted the concession for the second GSM network in Croatia in September 1998, Vipnet started its commercial operations on July 1, 1999. In 1999, Vipnet was the first on the Croatian market to offer its customers Vipme prepaid, with no subscription fee and a year later Vipnet introduced the first mobile payment service in Croatia – Vip parking, which was later used and introduced by other operators. As a part of Telekom Austria Group and because of TAG's partnership agreement with Vodafone, Vipnet was the first in Croatia to present a new business communications solution – Vodafone Blackberry, in 2004.

Later on, in 2006, Vipnet offered an alternative to fixed telephony line with the Vodafone Homebox to its private customers, small and medium enterprises and in February 2008 introduced the first prepaid fixed line in Croatia – Vipme Homebox.

In March 2007 it was the first in Europe to demonstrate mobile Internet access via its HSDPA 7.2 network and in February 2009 was among the first in the world to successfully test the latest technology for mobile broadband – HSPA+.

At the end of 2008, Vipnet had 2.5 million customers, up 14.1% compared to end of 2007. Its market share is 42.2%, down from 43% share at the end of 2007. , it had 1.964 million customers.

2010–2017

In 2010, Vipnet introduced ADSL and in the same year presented Dual Carrier HSDPA technology. Also in the same year developed a range of services based on cloud computing such as Vip auto nadzor (Vip car surveillance), Vip nadzor radnog vremena (Vip business hours surveillance), Vip nadzor prodaje (Vip sales surveillance) and Vip nadzor brodova (Vip ship surveillance). With these services customers achieve significant savings, because they do not have to invest in expensive technology or have their own IT infrastructure. In March 2011, Vipnet was the first in Croatia to test LTE at 800 MHz for covering Croatia with the most advanced wireless broadband. 

In August 2011, the company acquired B.net, the largest Croatian cable operator that offered fixed telephony, broadband Internet access and television services such as cable television and satellite television. This acquisition for €93 million was the biggest takeover within the Croatian telecom market.

At the beginning of 2012, Vipnet was the first on the market to offer combi packages for fixed and mobile services. In March 2012, Vipnet and Ericsson Nikola Tesla launched the first commercial LTE network in Croatia. Following the April 2012 and the introduction of a high quality digital television VipTV, in October 2012 Vipnet became the first and only operator that has made available, in all areas of Croatia, the complete 5-play service, which includes Vip TV, mobile and fixed telephony, as well as mobile and fixed Internet – and all on one bill. Also, in May 2012 Vipnet was first to set a world record in data transmission on the fixed network with  speeds of up to 4.3 Gbit/s which is 1000 times greater than the average in Croatian households.

Vipnet finished the year 2012 presenting its new technological and business complex in Žitnjak. The complex was worth 50 million HRK, it is energy self-sufficient and also contains one of the largest data center in the region.

In 2013, the company acquired Digi TV Croatia (Digi satelitska televizija d.o.o.), one of the providers of satellite television on the Croatian market, which began operating in November 2006. All customers were transferred to the satellite television company's own service Vip TV.

After the Agency for the Protection of Market Competition approved the acquisition of Vipnet and Metronet telecommunications in 2017, the takeover process was completed. Metronet was a provider of telecommunications services to business users with more than 4,300 users and possessed a 4,000-kilometer optical infrastructure. The value of the acquisition has not been announced.

References

External links 
 

América Móvil
Telecommunications companies of Croatia
Telecommunications companies established in 1999
Mobile phone companies of Croatia
Croatian companies established in 1999